
Gmina Świeszyno is a rural gmina (administrative district) in Koszalin County, West Pomeranian Voivodeship, in north-western Poland.

Villages
Gmina Świeszyno contains the villages and settlements of Bagno, Bardzlino, Biała Kępa, Brzeźniki, Chałupy, Chłopska Kępa, Czacz, Czaple, Czersk Koszaliński, Dunowo, Giezkowo, Golica, Jarzyce, Kępa Świeszyńska, Kłokęcin, Konikowo, Krokowo, Kurozwęcz, Mierzym, Niedalino, Niekłonice, Olszak, Sieranie, Strzekęcino, Świeszyno, Węgorki, Wiązogóra, Włoki, Zegrze Pomorskie and Zegrzyn.

Neighbouring gminas
Gmina Świeszyno is bordered by the city of Koszalin and by the gminas of Białogard, Biesiekierz, Bobolice, Manowo and Tychowo.

References
Polish official population figures 2006

Swieszyno
Gmina Swieszyno